Kurt Frank Becker (born December 22, 1958) is a former American football guard. He played college football  at the University of Michigan from 1978 to 1981, was selected as a first-team All-American in 1981, and played professional football in the National Football League (NFL) for the Chicago Bears (1982-1988, 1990) and the Los Angeles Rams (1989).

Early years
Becker was born in Aurora, Illinois, in 1958.  He attended East Aurora High School in suburban Chicago.

University of Michigan
Becker enrolled at the University of Michigan in 1977 and played college football as an offensive guard for Bo Schembechler's Michigan Wolverines football teams from 1978 to 1981.  He started 36 consecutive games between 1979 and 1981. He was selected as a first-team player on both the 1980 and 1981 All-Big Ten Conference football teams. As a senior, he was also Michigan's co-captain and a Lombardi Award finalist, and was selected by the Associated Press, Newspaper Enterprise Association, and American Football Coaches Association as a first-team player on the 1981 College Football All-America Team.

Professional football
Becker was selected by the Chicago Bears in the sixth round (146th overall pick) of the 1982 NFL Draft. He played at the guard position for the Chicago Bears from 1982 to 1988.  He was the Bears' starting right guard in 1983 and 1984, appearing in 32 games, 30 as a starter, during those two seasons. In 1986, he won the Super Bowl with the Bears. He played for the Los Angeles Rams for two games during the 1989 NFL season before returning to the Bears for 10 games as a backup in 1990.

Later years
As of 2010, Becker was the associate head coach for Marmion Academy, a college-prep academy in Aurora. From 2013-2017, he was the head coach for the East Aurora High School football program.

References

1958 births
Living people
All-American college football players
American football offensive guards
Chicago Bears players
Los Angeles Rams players
Michigan Wolverines football players
Sportspeople from Aurora, Illinois
Players of American football from Illinois